AuthenTec, Inc. was a semiconductor, computer security, mobile security, identity management, biometrics, and touch control solutions company based in Melbourne, Florida. Founded in 1998 after being spun off from Harris Semiconductor, AuthenTec provided mobile security software licenses to mobile manufacturing companies and biometrics sensor technology, such as fingerprint sensors and NFC technology to mobile and computer manufacturers. On 27 July 2012, AuthenTec was acquired by Apple Inc. for $356 million.

History 

In 1998, AuthenTec was spun off from parent company Harris Semiconductor.
On 27 June 2007, AuthenTec became a publicly traded company.
On 2 May 2008, AuthenTec acquired EzValidation.
On 14 July 2009, AuthenTec acquired Atrua Technologies for $5m.
On 26 February 2010, AuthenTec acquired SafeNet's Embedded Security Solutions division.
On 7 September 2010, AuthenTec merged with UPEK.
On August 2, 2011, AuthenTec began collaborating with NXP Semiconductors and mobile payment software firm DeviceFidelity to provide a combination of wireless chips, sensors, mobile applications and micro-SD cards to manufacturers and mobile network carriers of Android devices to support NFC mobile payments and transportation check-ins.
On 27 July 2012, AuthenTec was acquired by Apple Inc. for $356M.

Products and services 

TruePrint smart sensors
TrueSuite identity management software
TrueProtect embedded security products (formerly SafeNet Embedded Security Solutions)
Touch ID

References 

Access control
Biometrics
Computer companies established in 1998
Computer security companies
Data security
Companies based in Brevard County, Florida
Melbourne, Florida
Corporate spin-offs
Defunct semiconductor companies of the United States
Fabless semiconductor companies
Identity management
Apple Inc. acquisitions
2007 initial public offerings
Companies formerly listed on the Nasdaq
2012 mergers and acquisitions
Defunct computer companies of the United States
Defunct software companies of the United States